Bukit Daun (means: Leaves Hill) is a stratovolcano, located in a sparsely populated region in Sumatra, Indonesia. A 600 m wide of crater lake is located at the summit. A smaller crater lake, Tologo Kecil, is found in the south-west flank.

See also 

 List of volcanoes in Indonesia

References 

Volcanoes of Sumatra
Stratovolcanoes of Indonesia
Mountains of Sumatra
Volcanic crater lakes